Hill Art Foundation is a public exhibition and education space located in New York's Chelsea neighborhood. The foundation, founded by J. Tomilson and Janine Hill, opened to the public in February 2019. Located on 10th Avenue and West 24th Street in Peter Marino's Getty Building, the  space exhibits works from the Hill Art Foundation collection as well as works on loan. The Foundation is free and open to the public and will offer educational programming for the public as well as for New York City high school students.

Architecture
The foundation has two main galleries, one of them double-height, overlooking the High Line, and some smaller spaces also designed for showing art.

Works
The Hill Collection focuses on in-depth collecting within four main categories: Renaissance and Baroque bronzes, Old Master paintings, Modern Masters, and Contemporary artists. Works from the Hill Collection have been loaned to prominent museums worldwide, including the 2014 exhibition Renaissance and Baroque Bronzes from the Hill Collection at The Frick Collection which featured Renaissance and Baroque bronzes and a selection of Post-War works from the collection.

References

Art museums and galleries in New York City
Chelsea, Manhattan